In chemistry, cyanate esters are chemical compounds in which the hydrogen atom of the cyanic acid is replaced by an organyl group (for example aryl group). The resulting compound is termed a cyanate ester, with the formula , where R is an organyl group. Cyanate esters contain a monovalent cyanate group .

Use in resins

Cyanate esters can be cured and postcured by heating, either alone at elevated temperatures or at lower temperatures in presence of a suitable catalyst. The most common catalysts are transition metal complexes of cobalt, copper, manganese and zinc. The result is a thermoset material with a very high glass-transition temperature (Tg) of up to 400 °C, and a very low dielectric constant, providing excellent long term thermal stability at elevated end use temperatures, very good fire, smoke and toxicity performance and specific suitability for printed circuit boards installed in critical electrical devices. This is also due to its low moisture uptake.
This property, together with a higher toughness compared to epoxies, also makes it a valuable material in aerospace applications. For example, the Lynx Mark II spaceplane is primarily made of carbon/cyanate ester.

The chemistry of the cure reaction is a trimerization of three CN groups to a triazine ring. When the monomer contains two cyanate groups the resulting structure is a 3D polymer network. Thermoset polymer matrix properties can be fine tuned by the choice of substituents in the bisphenolic compound. Bisphenol A and novolac based cyanate esters are the major products; bisphenol F and bisphenol E are also used. The aromatic ring of the bisphenol can be substituted with an allylic group for improved toughness of the material. Cyanate esters can also be mixed with bismaleimides to form BT-resins or with epoxy resins to optimize the end use properties.

References 

Cyanates
Functional groups
Esters